Tom Tong is an entrepreneur, and founder of Ganqishi (甘其食) and Tom's BaoBao restaurants.

Early life 
Tong is a native of Wenling (温岭), a seaside town in Zhejiang Province, China. This town and the surrounding region is rich in culinary and artisanal traditions that persist into the 21st century. Tong's family moved to Shanghai when he was nine.  As a child, Tong was often given bao as a treat from his grandfather as a reward for good behavior on trips to the market.

Education 
Tong attended Tongji University in Shanghai, He studied locomotive engineering. While Tong was a student, he opened and managed five companies, including a hair salon, shoe store and an Internet café.

Career

Research in Hangzhou 
Tong spent four years in Hangzhou, Zhejiang Province, China doing market research by analyzing the eating habits of the local population and studying the successes and failures of other restaurants. Tong focused on finding out what the local population desired in their food and how he could bring it to them consistently and on a large scale, pursuing a reversal of the trend of cheap, unhealthy street food. Tong's goal was to engineer a successful bao making system that would include a privately owned commissary, vertical integration of ingredients, and a dedicated training center for his staff. This plan eventually included large installations in Shanghai and Hangzhou, as well as the assumption by Ganqishi ( 甘其食)

Ganqishi 

Tom Tong founded Ganqishi at the conclusion of his initial research in Hangzhou. Tong's founding of Ganqishi was in opposition to what he believed bao had become in modern China: cheap street food, made by machine and frozen before being served. Tong saw an opportunity to elevate the status of a food that was close to his heart, and revive the art of bao making on a larger scale than it had ever been done before. The first 'Ganqishi' bao restaurant was opened in 2009 in Hangzhou, and today there are around 200 in Hangzhou, Shanghai, and Suzhou. Tom has expanded into Shanghai, reinvented the layouts of his stores twice. In all, Ganqishi customers in China eat over a quarter million bao a day.

First Generation 
The first series of Ganqishi stores. This generation focused on sidewalk service from within small store spaces. As of 2015, these stores were all updated to Second Generation standards or shuttered to avoid dilution of the brand.

Second Generations 
The updated stores and production model saw a re-imagining of many classic recipes, and continued use of the orange-red motif as in the original design. Currently, this model of restaurant embodies the majority of Ganqishi's 200+ locations. As of Summer of 2015, no new second generation stores are being built, as the company shifts toward creating a greener, healthier brand with their Third Generation restaurants.

Third Generations 
 Going Green – In an attempt to decrease the environmental impact of Ganqishi's operations, biodegradable cups and other items were added to third generation stores. Additionally, any remaining unnatural chemicals were removed from recipes, and the design of the store was updated to a "greenhouse" motif to emphasize the focus on reverence and respect for nature.
 Shanghai Expansion – Tong began his expansion of Ganqishi into Hangzhou by feeding 10,000 people, mostly students, at his alma mater, Tongji University at the beginning of the school year over two days. Since then, Ganqishi has expanded to numerous locations across the metropolis, including the historic French Concession neighborhood.
 Alibaba – in 2015, only two days before Alibaba's record-breaking 11/11 sale, Ganqishi opened one of its third generation stores in the Alibaba Campus in Hangzhou. This opening was spurred by the interest of Jack Ma (Alibaba CEO) in promoting better food and innovative businesses to his employees in collaboration with Tong's continued expansion of Ganqishi.

Tom's BaoBao 

Tom's BaoBao is the company's American subsidiary.

Expanding to the US 
Tom began exploring Rhode Island and Massachusetts on vacation, and decided it was the perfect place to begin a new venture in the US under the name Tom's BaoBao. The first store had opened in July 2016 in Cambridge, Massachusetts' historic Harvard Square neighborhood. Tom's BaoBao will also open a second location in Providence, Rhode Island, in October 2016. Tong has stated that the food market in southern New England is perfectly positioned for disruption from an authentic Chinese food concept and that he also thinks the opportunity for cultural exchange between China and the US will be strengthened by his company's introduction to the area. Tong's business strategy is to train his store-level employees to a higher level than competing fast-casual restaurant concepts in order to allow them to deliver service at fast food speeds while still practicing a traditional culinary art in an artisan style.

Training Americans 
In order to translate authentic Bao to America, Tong decided that it was necessary to train American employees in the same conditions as his Chinese employees. He accomplished this by sending several waves of staff to China for extensive training. After several months of additional practice at dedicated facilities in the US, the staff was expanded and opening of the first Tom's BaoBao location in Harvard Square was slated for early Summer, 2016.

References

External links 
 Tomsbaobao.com
 Ganqishi.com
 Baoist at ediblecommunities.com
 Tom Tong's ‘A Baozi Maker’ Yixi Talk
 A Taste of Ganqishi Video

Businesspeople from Zhejiang
Living people
People from Taizhou, Zhejiang
1975 births